Michele Toma (born 9 August 1938) is an Italian wrestler. He competed in the men's Greco-Roman bantamweight at the 1964 Summer Olympics.

Toma is a former athlete of the Gruppo Sportivo Fiamme Oro.

References

1938 births
Living people
Italian male sport wrestlers
Olympic wrestlers of Italy
Wrestlers at the 1964 Summer Olympics
Sportspeople from Rome
Wrestlers of Fiamme Oro